Nagapur is a village in the Pratapgarh district of Uttar Pradesh state, India.  It is part of the Katra Gulab Singh postal district.

Villages in Pratapgarh district, Uttar Pradesh